Bilal Khan (August 15, 1978 – August 14, 2010) was a Pakistani television actor and model, known for some of his lead roles in major Pakistani drama serials. Khan previously acted in Pakistani movies and the ATV serials such as Dehli kay Bankay and Pal Bhar Mein. He came to prominence after starring in the 2002 Lollywood release Pehla Sajda.

On August 11, 2010, Khan was critically injured during an accidental gas explosion while on set in Islamabad, where he was shooting. He died from his injuries a day before his 32nd birthday, on August 14, 2010. One of his last roles was a guest appearance in the 2010 drama serial Dastaan.

References

1978 births
2010 deaths
Male actors from Lahore
Pakistani male film actors
Pakistani male models
Pakistani male television actors
Place of birth missing